Jerge-Tal (formerly: Uspenovka) is a village in Jalal-Abad Region of Kyrgyzstan. It is part of the Aksy District. Its population was 5,436 in 2021.

Population

References

Populated places in Jalal-Abad Region